David Sayler is the current director of athletics for Miami University. He previously served as athletic director at the University of South Dakota from 2010 to 2012 and interim athletic director at Rice University from 2009 to 2010.

References

External links
 Miami profile

Living people
Miami RedHawks athletic directors
Rice Owls athletic directors
South Dakota Coyotes athletic directors
Place of birth missing (living people)
1969 births